SUU may refer to:

 SUU, the IATA and FAA LID code for Travis Air Force Base, Fairfield, California
 SUU, the National Rail code for Sunbury railway station, Surrey, England
 Southern Utah University, a public university in Cedar City, Utah